Oscar "Oca" Gonzales Malapitan (born June 14, 1955) is a Filipino politician who currently serves as the representative from the 1st District of Caloocan in the House of Representatives of the Philippines since 2022 and previously from 2004 to 2013. He also served as Mayor of Caloocan from 2013 to 2022, Vice Mayor of Caloocan from 2001 to 2004, and City Councilor from 1992 to 1998. He also unsuccessfully ran for representative in 2001. He is currently a member of the Nacionalista Party.

As representative, Malapitan pushed for the renovation of Dr. Jose N. Rodriguez Memorial Hospital to become a tertiary-level hospital, the establishment of Caloocan National Science and Technology High School, and the establishment of four new branches of the Metropolitan Trial Court at Caloocan.

References

External links
 
 

1955 births
Living people
Nacionalista Party politicians
United Nationalist Alliance politicians
Members of the House of Representatives of the Philippines from Caloocan
Mayors of Caloocan
Metro Manila city and municipal councilors